Toy Matinee was a short-lived American rock band, which released one eponymous album.  Their sound featured an array of influences, including progressive rock, AOR and pop reminiscent of both the Beatles and the Beach Boys.

Around the end of 1988, Patrick Leonard approached bassist Guy Pratt about forming a band and helping him audition and recruit members, as the two had become friends through working on Madonna's True Blue album, and other material previously. Pratt agreed and from then through the beginning of 1989, they recruited singer/lyricist/multi-instrumentalist Kevin Gilbert, drummer Brian MacLeod, and guitarist Tim Pierce to complete the ensemble. Pratt recalls that for various legal reasons he never signed up as a full member of the band despite being in at the start of the project and co-writing half of the songs on the band's only album, which featured guest appearances from other musicians including Julian Lennon.  The album was engineered and produced by Bill Bottrell, and released by Reprise Records in 1990.

The album's themes covered a broad ground.  The lead single and album opener "Last Plane Out" came from a long standing fascination Pratt had with the idea of the last flight out of a war zone, and the tracks "Turn It On Salvador" and "Remember My Name" were dedicated to painter Salvador Dalí, and Czech poet and political figure Václav Havel respectively. "Queen of Misery" is about Madonna; Leonard was the singer's longtime songwriting and producing partner, and he and most of the other members of Toy Matinee had worked on Madonna's I'm Breathless album—Leonard as producer/writer/keyboardist, Pratt on bass, Gilbert and Bottrell as producers and engineers, and Pierce on guitar.

After the album was released, Pratt went on tour with Pink Floyd to promote their Momentary Lapse of Reason album, a commitment he had made prior to the project beginning (and being engaged at the time to Gala Wright, daughter of Pink Floyd's keyboard player Richard Wright, one he was loath to break). MacLeod and Pierce moved on to other session work, and Leonard was not interested in being part of a tour that involved replacing so many of the original members.  Gilbert took on that role himself instead, assembling a promotional band for the album which featured Gilbert's then girlfriend, Sheryl Crow, on keyboards, Marc Bonilla on guitar, Spencer Campbell on bass and Toss Panos on drums. There were a number of short tours.

A 1991 live recording of Gilbert and this touring band performing songs from the album was released in 2010 as Kevin Gilbert Performs Toy Matinee Live at the Roxy.  The group engaged in heavy radio promotion wherever possible, most notably frequent appearances on the Mark & Brian show on Los Angeles-area station KLOS.  Some of those sessions were released on Mark & Brian's KLOS compilation recordings, such as a stripped down version of "The Ballad Of Jenny Ledge" on their You Had to Be There collection.

Two of the songs on Toy Matinee—"The Ballad of Jenny Ledge" and "Last Plane Out"—received wide play on AOR stations partly due to Gilbert's promotional work, both of them peaking at No. 23 on Billboard's Mainstream Rock Tracks chart. Despite the chart success of the singles, the album's highest U.S. chart position was No. 129, and sales were enough below expectations that many unsold copies of the CD were widely available as cut-outs in the early '90s.

Gilbert went on to do additional work with Bottrell, including Sheryl Crow's debut album and solo projects. In 1994, Leonard and former Mr. Mister frontman Richard Page released the album Meanwhile as Third Matinee. Leonard has revealed that he spoke to Gilbert about doing "another project" shortly before Gilbert's untimely death in 1996 ended any possibility of a second Toy Matinee album. Retrospectively, Tim Pierce has called Toy Matinee "the greatest band he ever joined", while Guy Pratt has dubbed it "one of the coolest projects he was ever involved with."

Personnel 
Album musicians
Kevin Gilbert - vocals, guitar, keyboards
Patrick Leonard - keyboards, backing vocals
Brian MacLeod - drums, percussion
Tim Pierce - guitar 
Guy Pratt - bass
Bill Bottrell - guitar, percussion, backing vocals
Sal's Clarinet Trio: Jon Clarke, Jon Kip, Donald Markese - clarinet
Julian Lennon - backing vocals (2, 3)
Durga McBroom - backing vocals (3)
Live band
Kevin Gilbert - vocals, guitars, keyboards, piano
Marc Bonilla - guitars, backing vocals
Spencer Campbell - bass, backing vocals
Sheryl Crow - keyboards, piano, backing vocals
Toss Panos - drums, percussion

Album track listing

Surround releases 

In 1999 the album was remixed into surround by DTS Entertainment, and released as a DTS encoded 5.1 compact disc with a slightly altered version of the first track, "Last Plane Out".  A second DTS version was released in 2001 as a DVD-Audio title, using Meridian Lossless Packing and a 2.0 channel stereo version of the album encoded in Dolby Digital.  The 2001 stereo remaster and the 2.0 Dolby Digital version on the DVD-Audio release all include the alternate "Last Plane Out".  None of the bonus tracks are included on either surround release.

References

External links 
 Toy Matinee page at Blue Desert
 Official Kevin Gilbert website
 Unofficial Myspace Page
 Guy Pratt YouTube discussing "Last Plane Out" and the formation of the band

American progressive rock groups
1990 debut albums
Albums produced by Bill Bottrell
Reprise Records albums